"Hello, Dolly!" is the title song of the popular 1964 musical of the same name. Louis Armstrong's version was inducted into the Grammy Hall of Fame in 2001.
 
The music and lyrics were written by Jerry Herman, who also wrote the scores for many other popular musicals including Mame and La Cage aux Folles.

History
"Hello, Dolly!" was first sung by Carol Channing, who starred as Dolly Gallagher Levi in the original 1964 Broadway cast. In December 1963, at the behest of his manager, Louis Armstrong made a demonstration recording of "Hello, Dolly!" for the song's publisher to use to promote the show. Hello, Dolly! opened on January 16, 1964, at the St. James Theatre in New York City, and it quickly became a major success.

The same month, Kapp Records released Armstrong's publishing demo as a commercial single. His version reached  1 on the U.S. Billboard Hot 100, ending the Beatles' streak of 3 chart-topping hits in a row over 14 consecutive weeks. "Hello Dolly!" became the most successful single of Armstrong's career, followed by a Gold-selling album of the same name. The song also spent nine weeks atop the adult contemporary chart shortly after the opening of the musical. The song also made Armstrong the oldest artist ever to reach  1 on the Hot 100 since its introduction in 1958. Billboard ranked the record as the  3 song of 1964, behind the Beatles' "I Want to Hold Your Hand" and "She Loves You".

"Hello, Dolly!" won the Grammy Award for Song of the Year in 1965, and Armstrong received a Grammy for Best Vocal Performance, Male. Louis Armstrong also performed the song (together with Barbra Streisand) in the popular 1969 film Hello, Dolly!.

Charts

All-time charts

"Hello, Lyndon!"
Lyndon B. Johnson, often referred to by the moniker "LBJ",  used the tune, rechristened "Hello, Lyndon!", as a campaign song for his run in the 1964 U.S. presidential election. This version of the song was performed by Carol Channing at that year's Democratic National Convention, and a recording was made by Ed Ames for distribution at the convention.

The "Sunflower" controversy
"Hello, Dolly!" became caught up in a lawsuit which could have endangered plans for filming the musical. Mack David, a composer, sued for infringement of copyright, because the first four bars of "Hello, Dolly!"  were the same as those in the refrain of David's song "Sunflower" from 1948. As he recounts in his memoirs, Herman had never heard "Sunflower" before the lawsuit, and wanted a chance to defend himself in court, but, for the sake of those involved in the show and the potential film, he reluctantly agreed to pay a settlement before the case would have gone to trial.

References

1964 singles
1964 songs
Songs written by Jerry Herman
Louis Armstrong songs
Billboard Hot 100 number-one singles
Cashbox number-one singles
Grammy Hall of Fame Award recipients
Grammy Award for Song of the Year
Grammy Award for Best Male Pop Vocal Performance
Songs about New York City
Songs from musicals